The Mariana fruit bat (Pteropus mariannus), also known as the Mariana flying fox, and the fanihi in Chamorro, is a megabat found only in the Mariana Islands and Ulithi (an atoll in the Caroline Islands). Habitat loss has driven it to endangered status, and it is listed as threatened by the US Fish and Wildlife Service.  Poachers and food hunters, other animals, and natural causes have led to the decline.

Description
The Mariana fruit bat is a mid-sized bat which weighs , and has a forearm length of 5.3 to 6.1 in (13.4 to 15.6 cm).  Males of the species are slightly larger in size than the females.  Their abdomens are colored from black to brown, while also having gray hairs.  The mantle and the neck are a brighter brown to golden brown color and the head varies from brown to black.  Their ears are rounded and their eyes large, giving them the features of a canid, so many megabats are called flying foxes.

Threats
The bat is considered a culinary delicacy by Chamorros. Eating fruit bats is linked to a neurological disease called lytico-bodig disease. Paul Alan Cox from the Hawaiian National Tropical Botanical Garden in Kalaheo, and Oliver Sacks from Albert Einstein College in New York, found the bats consumed large quantities of cycad seeds, and - like some eagles, which were shown to build up levels of the pesticide DDT in fat tissue - probably accumulate the toxins to dangerous levels.

Conservation
In 2001, the population was estimated to number between 300 and 400 bats on Sarigan. The current population numbers are unknown, but one known concentration is on Ritidian Point in Guam. In 2013, Bat Conservation International listed this species as one of the 35 species of its worldwide priority list of conservation.

Behavior
Johnson and Wiles described roosting behavior: "Sarigan's population differs from those of larger islands in the archipelago by usually having smaller roost sizes, typically 3–75 bats, and large numbers of solitary bats that at times comprise up to half of the population. Colonies and smaller aggregations were composed primarily of harems with multiple females, whereas a nearly equal sex ratio occurred among solitary animals."

Subspecies 
Pteropus mariannus has three subspecies:
 P. m. mariannus (Guam Mariana fruit bat)
 P. m. paganensis (Pagan Mariana fruit bat)
 P. m. ulthiensis (Ulithi Mariana fruit bat)

See also
 Bat (food)

References

External links 

 "Endangered Species in the Pacific Islands: Mariana Fruit Bats / Fanihi",  U.S. Fish & Wildlife Service Pacific Islands Fish & Wildlife Office

Pteropus
Bats of Oceania
Fauna of Guam
Fauna of the Northern Mariana Islands
Mammals described in 1822
Endangered fauna of Oceania
ESA threatened species